Evgeni Vladimirovich Bumagin (born April 7, 1982) is a Russians-Kazakhstani former professional ice hockey winger. He played for Sibir Novosibirsk, HC Lada Togliatti, Metallurg Novokuznetsk and Barys Astana.

He participated at the 2010 IIHF World Championship as a member of the Kazakhstan men's national ice hockey team.

Bumagin was selected by the Detroit Red Wings in the 8th round (260th overall) of the 2000 NHL Entry Draft.

Career statistics

Regular season and playoffs

International

References

External links

1982 births
Living people
HC Almaty players
Barys Nur-Sultan players
HC CSK VVS Samara players
Detroit Red Wings draft picks
Dizel Penza players
Kazakhstani ice hockey right wingers
HC Lada Togliatti players
Metallurg Magnitogorsk players
Metallurg Novokuznetsk players
Neftyanik Almetyevsk players
HC Sibir Novosibirsk players
Russian emigrants to Kazakhstan
Yermak Angarsk players
Asian Games gold medalists for Kazakhstan
Medalists at the 2011 Asian Winter Games
Asian Games medalists in ice hockey
Ice hockey players at the 2011 Asian Winter Games
People from Belgorod
Sportspeople from Belgorod Oblast